Treason Keep is a fantasy novel written by Australian author Jennifer Fallon. It is the second in The Demon Child trilogy; the other two are Medalon and Harshini.

Summary
On the brink of death, R'shiel is taken to the Harshini haven of Sanctuary, where crucial decisions are being made.

References

External links
Jennifer Fallon's official website

Australian fantasy novels
Novels by Jennifer Fallon
HarperCollins books
2001 Australian novels